Jamie Gillis (born Jamey Ira Gurman; April 20, 1943 – February 19, 2010) was an American pornographic actor, director and member of the AVN Hall of Fame.
He was married to the porn actress Serena.

Early life
Gillis was born Jamey Ira Gurman in New York City. He was named after the Tyrone Power character in the film The Black Swan (1942), and he took the name Gillis from the girlfriend he was living with when he made his first films. Gillis later attended Columbia University and graduated magna cum laude. While supporting himself driving a cab, he answered an ad in The Village Voice.

Career
He appeared in more than 470 movies as an actor." He also directed several adult movies. Openly bisexual, he appeared in many gay porn films, including a sex scene with Zebedy Colt in the 1975 Gerard Damiano BDSM-themed film The Story of Joanna. Gillis appeared in the mainstream Hollywood film Nighthawks (1981) as the boss of Lindsay Wagner's character (he's credited as 'Designer'). He also made his name in two Radley Metzger films, The Opening of Misty Beethoven (1976) and Barbara Broadcast (1977); the former is considered, by award-winning author Toni Bentley, the "crown jewel" of the Golden Age of Porn.

According to Al Goldstein, Gillis was always described as "sexually the wildest, most decadent, off-the-wall guy in the business." His scene with Brooke Fields was emblematic in this regard.  He was a pioneer in the pornographic style known as Gonzo. In addition to starring in the first Buttman film, he also created the influential On the Prowl series. Featuring a porn star who rides in a limo looking for regular guys to have sex with, the video series was very popular and inspired a scene in the movie Boogie Nights. He also co-produced the popular Dirty Debutante series with fellow director and performer Ed Powers, as well as the Walking Toilet Bowl series of films that focused on golden showers and coprophilia.

Death
Gillis died on February 19, 2010, in New York City from melanoma, which was diagnosed four to five months earlier. In an audio interview given to The Rialto Report shortly before his death, Gillis stated that in the 1970s he had wanted his ashes to be scattered in Times Square, but years later he changed his mind, stating that the cleaned up Times Square that emerged in the 1990s would contaminate his ashes.

Filmography

As an actor, incomplete
 Die You Zombie Bastards! (2005)
 Potty Mouth (2004)
 Luv Generation (2004)
 Sunset Stripped (2002)
 New Wave Hookers 5 (1997)
 Bobby Sox (1996)
 Play My Flute (1991)
 Uncle Jamie's Double Trouble (1991)
 Playin' Dirty (1990)
 Jamie Gillis and Africa (1990)
 Alien Space Avenger (1989)
 Adventures of Buttman (1989)
 Head Lock (1989) 
 Taboo IV (1985)
 New Wave Hookers (1984)
 A Little Bit of Hanky Panky (1984)
 Night of the Zombies (1981)
 Roommates (1981)
 Wanda Whips Wall Street (1981)
 Nighthawks (1981)
 Dracula Exotica (1980)
 The Ecstasy Girls (1979)
 Sensual Fire (1979)
 Dracula Sucks (aka Lust At First Bite) (1978)
 A Coming of Angels (1977)
 Barbara Broadcast (1977)
 Obsessed (1977)
 Captain Lust and the Pirate Women (1977)Through the Looking Glass (1976)
 Water Power (1976)
 The Opening of Misty Beethoven (1976)
 Oriental Blue  (1976)
 Boy Napped (1975)
 Deep Throat Part II (1974)

As a director, incomplete
 Devious Old Gillis (1998)
 Back on the Prowl 2 (1998)
 Back on the Prowl (1998)
 Punished Sex Offenders (1990)
 Takeout Torture (1990)
 On the Prowl (1989)

Awards
 1976 AFAA Award – Best Actor (The Opening of Misty Beethoven)
 1977 AAFA Award – Best Actor (Coming of Angels)
 1979 AAFA Award – Best Actor (Ecstasy Girls)
 1982 AFAA Award – Best Supporting Actor (Roommates)
 1984 XRCO Award – Best Kinky Scene (Insatiable II)
 1985 XRCO Award – Best Kinky Scene (Nasty)
 1987 XRCO Award – Best Actor (Deep Throat 2)
 1987 XRCO Award – Best Supporting Actor (Babyface 2)
 1987 XRCO Award – Best Kinky Scene (Let's Get It On With Amber Lynn)
 1989 AVN Award – Best Supporting Actor – (Pretty Peaches 2)
 1989 XRCO Award – Best Actor (Second Skin)
 1997 AVN Award – Best Actor – Film (Bobby Sox)
 1999 AVN Award – Best Supporting Actor – Video (Forever Night)
 AVN Hall of Fame
 XRCO Hall of Fame

See also
 Golden Age of Porn
 List of male performers in gay porn films

Sources
 Nicolas Barbano: Verdens 25 hotteste pornostjerner (Rosinante, Denmark 1999) : Features a chapter on him.
 The Rialto Report: Jamie Gillis: New York Beginnings, audio interview with Jamie Gillis, November 17, 2013
 

References

External links
 
 
 
 Jamie Gillis: New York Beginnings, audio interview with Jamie Gillis, The Rialto Report, November 17, 2013
 
 The Prince of Gonzo Porn – July 2007 interview
 
 Interview by Al Goldstein in SCREW magazine'', July 9, 1973, pp. 5–8.

1943 births
2010 deaths
21st-century American male actors
American film directors
American people of Dutch-Jewish descent
American male pornographic film actors
American pornographic film directors
American pornographic film producers
Bisexual male pornographic film actors
Deaths from cancer in New York (state)
Deaths from melanoma
LGBT film directors
LGBT Jews
American LGBT actors
LGBT people from New York (state)
Male actors from New York City
Pornographic film actors from New York (state)
Columbia University alumni
American taxi drivers